Lisa A. Costa is an American defense official who has served as the deputy chief of space operations for technology and logistics of the United States Space Force. A member of the Senior Executive Service, Level 3, she is the first Chief Technology and Innovation Officer (CTIO) of the world's first space military service. The Space Force CTIO role is unique in the Department of Defense (DoD) and serves as the chief scientist, chief analytics officer,  chief data and A/I officer, chief information officer, and chief technology officer of the Service. She previously served as the first female director of  systems and the chief information officer (CIO) of the United States Special Operations Command. In November 2020, she joined the board of directors of CarParts.com.

Education 
 1986 Bachelor of Science, Mathematics & Computer Science, Rollins College Winter Park, FL
 1990 Master of Business Administration, Tampa College, Tampa, FL
 1993 Doctorate of Computer Science and Engineering Management, Union Institute Cincinnati, OH

Career 
1. September 2001-August 2010, Director, Non-traditional Information & Knowledge Exploitation Cell, Tampa, FL
2. September 2010-September 2013, Executive Director of Enterprise Integration, MITRE National Security Engineering Center, Washington, DC
3. September 2013-March 2017, Director of Counter Weapons of Mass Destruction and Violent Extremism, Washington, DC
4. March 2017-March 2018, Vice President of Intelligence and Chief Scientist, PlanteRisk, Washington, DC
5. March 2018-October 2018, Senior Director of Innovation & Technology, Engility Corporation, Washington, DC
6. October 2018-present, Director of Communications Systems and the Chief Information Officer, U.S. Special Operations Command, MacDill AFB, FL

Awards and decorations 
Costa is the recipient of the following awards:
 1993 Best Paper Award in Technical Track – Evaluation of X-Based Desktops
 1998 Special Recognition Award – Integrated Survey Program
 1998 Program Recognition Award – Collaborative Contingency Targeting
 2000 MITRE Technology Innovation Director’s Award
 2001 MITRE Senior Vice President General Manager Award
 2002 Special Operations Joint Interagency Collaboration Center
 2002 AFCEA International Meritorious Service Award
 2002 MITRE Corporation President’s Knowledge Management Award – Intelligence Analysis Cell Initiative
 2003 AFCEA International Meritorious Service Award
 2004 AFCEA International Meritorious Services Award – Engineering
 2005 AFCEA International Commendation Award – Mid-Career Intelligence Contributions
 2008 Special Programs Award – Working in the Shadows
 2011 Program Recognition Award – Social Network Analysis Reachback Capability
 2011 Director DIA Award – Intelligence Transformation in Afghanistan
 2013 Officer’s Award – Scientific Contribution to MITRE’s Technical Stature
 2013 Officer’s Award – Development and transition of Research into Operational Capability
 2014 Officer’s Award – Leadership in Integration
 2015 Officer’s Award – Delivering Transformational Solutions that Drive Mission Success
 2016 Rollings College Alumni Achievement Award
 2020 Federal 100 Award
 2021 Joint Chiefs of Staff Joint Meritorious Civilian Service Award
 2022 Washington 100 (WASH100)

References 

 

Living people
Year of birth missing (living people)
Place of birth missing (living people)